Teni may refer to:

 Teni (singer) (born 1992), Nigerian singer
 Thiazole tautomerase, enzyme
 Theni, town in India
 TENI, the Transgender Equality Network of Ireland
 The Russian title of Shadows, a 1953 Soviet film